The Northern School of Art is a further and higher education art and design college, based in Middlesbrough and Hartlepool in the north-east of England. The college was called Cleveland College of Art and Design after the former non-metropolitan county of Cleveland, operational from 1974 to 1996. In April 2018 it was announced that the college would change its name to The Northern School of Art effective from September 2018.

The college's current principal is Martin Raby.

History and estates
Middlesbrough School of Art, on Durham Street, and the nearby Government School of Arts in the Athenaeum on Church Street, West Hartlepool first opened in 1870 and 1874 respectively.

In May 1960, the Green Lane campus based in the Linthorpe area of Middlesbrough was opened by Robin Darwin, then-Principal of the Royal College of Art, and was later extended as Middlesbrough School of Art. The campus closed its doors and re-located to the centre of Middlesbrough in September 2021.

The Northern School of Art
The Northern School of Art is the only specialist art and design college in the north-east of England and one of only three in the country in the further education sector.
The college currently has three campuses, one in Middlesbrough, one in Church Square, Hartlepool and a second Hartlepool Campus located on Church Street.

Middlesbrough campus
The new £14 million Middlesbrough-based campus opened in September 2021 and is a purpose-built, three-storey building located in the town centre on Newport Road. It is adjacent to a Sainsbury's supermarket and within a short walking distance of both the bus and railway stations. The Middlesbrough campus offers HE, A-levels and UAL Diplomas through a range of creative art & design courses.

Church Square campus
The college has operated continuously in its present Hartlepool spot since 1938, despite a 1966 fire. It is located off Church Street (A178) at the junction of the A689 (Stockton Street) and A178, and near the railway station.

Church Street Campus 
Opening in 2017, the Church street campus was the first phase of the School's £11 million development in Hartlepool. The new campus is now host to courses such as Commercial Photography, Production Design for Stage and Screen, Film and Theatre Production, Costume design and more. 

With the development of the new building came the procurement of nearby bus sheds. The  sheds will become purpose-built dedicated film and TV sound studios with the aim to boost film and TV production in the north-east and create a major industry hub.

Courses
The Northern School of Art is an institution of both further and higher education, and because of this it has courses aimed at 16-year-old school-leavers all the way through to degree level, as well as part-time evening classes.

FE courses

The college offers a range of A-Level and University of the Arts London Extended Diplomas across the whole art and design spectrum, including Design Crafts, Graphic Design, Fine Art, Fashion & Textiles, Photography, 3D design and Interactive Design. The college also offers a UAL Level 2 course and Bronze and Silver Awards.

The Northern School of Art also offers a Diploma in Foundation Studies in Art & Design, a course traditionally undertaken by A-level students prior to enrolling on an art and design course at university.

HE courses
At higher education level, the college also offers BA (Hons) and FdA degrees, covering such subjects as textiles, Commercial Photography, Creative Photography, Fine Art, Illustration, Creative film and moving image, Costume Design, Graphic Design, theatre design, Acting, Lighting for stage and screen, vfx, 3D Design and Body Contour Fashion. All higher education courses are validated by the Arts University Bournemouth.

Notable alumni

 Basil Beattie, artist (1955)
 Steve Bell, cartoonist (1970)
 David Coverdale, rock singer
 Melissa-Jane Daniel, archer
 Chris Dooks, South Bank Show TV director (1991)
 Margaret Green
 Ted Harrison, Canadian artist (1949)
 Curtis Jobling, designer of Bob the Builder (1994)
 Richard Milward, author
 Robert Nixon, cartoonist
 Zooey Perry, Premier League Handball player in Oslo, Norway (2016)
 Narbi Price, artist (1999)
 Sir Ridley Scott, film director (1958)
 Tony Scott, film director
 Graham Smith, photographer
 Paul Smith, musician (1998)
 Mackenzie Thorpe, artist (1979)
 William Tillyer, artist (1959)
 Tom Wall, artist and lecturer at the college for 23 years until 1991

See also
 Cleveland Institute of Art, similar-named American institution

References

External links
 
 The Northern School of Art listing on "Get information about schools" website

Education in Middlesbrough
Art schools in England
Educational institutions established in 1870
Further education colleges in North Yorkshire
1870 establishments in England